Harald Grieg (3 August 1894 – 6 October 1972) was a Norwegian publisher. He was  director of Gyldendal Norsk Forlag and for  many years was a leading figure in the Norwegian book industry.

Biography
Grieg was born in Bergen, Norway. He was the son of  Peter Lexau Grieg (1864–1924) and Helga Vollan (1869–1946). His  brother Nordahl Grieg was a writer and an active member of the Norwegian Armed Forces in exile during the Second World War.

After graduation of artium at the Bergen Cathedral School in 1912, he traveled to Kristiania (now Oslo) to continue his studies.  
He became cand.philol. at the University of Kristiania in  1917. He became  Kristiania  correspondent for the Bergen-based newspaper Morgenavisen. In 1920 he received an offer to join the Norwegian department of Gyldendalske Boghandel Nordisk Forlag. When the independent Gyldendal Norsk Forlag was founded in 1925, with Grieg as CEO, the new publisher had a residual debt to its Danish counterpart, which was repaid in six years.

During their occupation of Norway starting in 1940, the Nazi occupation authorities used Gylendal to publish its propaganda material. Noted novelist Knut Hamsun (a friend of Grieg's) was heavily involved in the propaganda project.
Grieg was also chairman of the board of Nationaltheatret. In June 1941 the board rejected subordination under the so-called Ministry of Culture and Enlightenment. This provoked the authorities, and Grieg, board member Francis Bull and theatre director Johannes Sejersted Bødtker were arrested on 26 June 1941. Grieg was incarcerated at Grini concentration camp, but was later released. Knut Hamsun's son Tore Hamsun was installed as acting director of Gyldendal publishing house.

After the war's end  in 1945, Harald Grieg returned to his old post and remained director until 1970. Grieg was chairman of the Norwegian Publishers' Association(1936–1941) and (1945–1960). From 1948 until 1964, he was chairman of the Foundation for Swedish-Norwegian Cooperation (Fondet for svensk-norsk samarbeid).

Awards
Grieg was the Commander of the Order of St. Olav   (1962), Commander of the Swedish Order of the Polar Star, Commander of the Order of the White Rose of Finland and of the Danish Order of the Dannebrog. In 1958 he was awarded the  Riksmål Society Literature Prize.

References

External links 

Family genealogy

1894 births
1972 deaths
Businesspeople from Bergen
People educated at the Bergen Cathedral School
University of Oslo alumni
Norwegian book publishers (people)
Norwegian people of World War II
Grini concentration camp survivors
Recipients of the St. Olav's Medal
Order of the Polar Star
Order of the Dannebrog
Norwegian magazine founders